Straight Lines may refer to:

 Straight line, in mathematical geometry
 Straight Lines (band), a Canadian pop-rock band
 Straight Lines (album), by Ken Vandermark
 Straight Lines (EP), by Junip
 "Straight Lines" (song), by Silverchair
 "Straight Lines", a song by New Musik from From A to B
 "Straight Lines", a song by Hayden Thorpe from Diviner

See also
 No Straight Lines, an anthology by Justin Hall